Taaleri Plc (previously Taaleritehdas) is a Finnish investment and asset management group concentrated on renewable energy and other alternative investments. The company is listed on Nasdaq Helsinki.

History

Taaleritehdas (2007–2015) 
Taaleritehdas started its operations in 2007.

In 2010 Taaleritehdas provided wealth management services, and managed various funds including a Turkish investment fund  and Russian investment fund. Other funds included a Finnish value stock fund; a fund, based on the Yale University investment model of asset allocation (developed by David F. Swensen); and a fund concentrating on emerging European markets in Eastern Europe.

Taaleri (2016–) 
In the end of 2021 Taaleri had 2.2 billion euros of assets under management in its private equity funds and co-investments.

References

External links
Taaleri website

Financial services companies of Finland